Rhombophryne laevipes is a frog of the family Microhylidae. It is endemic to Madagascar and known from localities in northern, eastern, southeastern, and mid-western parts of the island. It might be a species complex, with the "true" R. laevipes restricted to northern Madagascar.

Rhombophryne laevipes occurs in rainforests, including degraded ones. It is a burrowing species. Although rare, it is widespread and tolerates some habitat modification, hence the International Union for Conservation of Nature (IUCN) does not consider it threatened.

References 

laevipes
Amphibians described in 1895
Taxa named by François Mocquard
Endemic frogs of Madagascar